ISO 9060, Specification and classification of instruments for measuring hemispherical solar and direct solar radiation, is an ISO standard for the classification of pyranometers and pyrheliometers.

References

09060
Meteorological instrumentation and equipment